Fishers is a city in Fall Creek and Delaware townships, Hamilton County, Indiana, United States. As of the 2010 census the population was 76,794, and by 2019 the estimated population was 95,310. A suburb of Indianapolis, Fishers has grown rapidly in recent decades: about 350 people lived there in 1963, 2,000 in 1980, and only 7,500 as recently as 1990.

After the passage of a referendum on its status in 2012, Fishers transitioned from a town to a city on January 1, 2015. The first mayor of Fishers, Scott Fadness, and with the city's first clerk and city council were sworn in on December 21, 2014.

History

19th century
In 1802, William Conner settled what is now Fishers. Conner built a log cabin and a trading post along the White River. The land that Conner settled is now known as Conner Prairie and is preserved as a living history museum.

Settlers started moving to the area after Indiana became a state in 1816 and the Delaware Indians gave up their claims in Indiana and Ohio to the United States government in 1818 in the Treaty of St. Mary's. At the treaty William Conner served as an interpreter for Chief William Anderson, his father-in-law. At the time William Conner was married to Mekinges Conner, princess and daughter of Chief William Anderson. In 1823, Hamilton County was chartered by the Indiana General Assembly and Delaware Township was established and surveyed. After the state of Indiana moved its capital to Indianapolis from Corydon in 1825, the community started to grow. After the move, John Finch established a horse-powered grinding mill, a blacksmith shop, and the area's first school. The next year the area's first water mill was constructed.

During 1826 the West-Harris House, later nicknamed Ambassador House, was built near the White River at present-day 96th Street and Allisonville Road in Fishers. The home was moved to its present-day site at 106th Street and Eller Road in 1996. Addison C. Harris (1840–1916), a prominent Indianapolis lawyer and former member of the Indiana Senate (1876 to 1880), acquired the property in 1880 and had the home remodeled and enlarged around 1895. Harris and wife, India Crago Harris (1848–1948), used the home as a summer residence. Its nickname of Ambassador House relates to Addison Harris's diplomatic service (1899 to 1901) as U.S. Envoy Extraordinary and Minister Plenipotentiary to Austria-Hungary during President William McKinley's administration. The restored Ambassador House is located on the grounds of Heritage Park at White River in Fishers and is operated as a local history museum and a site for community events and private rentals.

In 1849, construction began on the Peru & Indianapolis Railroad, extending from Indianapolis to Chicago. The railroad brought several people to the area then known as "Fisher's Switch". In 1872, Fisher's Switch, also known as "Fishers Station", was platted by Salathial Fisher at the present-day intersection of 116th Street and the railroad. Indiana's General Assembly incorporated Fisher's Station in 1891.

The William Conner House and West-Harris House are listed on the National Register of Historic Places.

20th century
In 1908, the post office changed the name of Fishers Switch to "Fishers" by dropping "Switch."

After William Conner's death in 1855, his family farm became a place of interest. The Hamilton County Historical Society placed a marker on the site of the William Conner farm in 1927. Eli Lilly, then head of Eli Lilly and Company, purchased William Conner's farm in 1934 and began restoring it. In 1964, Lilly asked Earlham College to oversee the Conner farm, now known as Conner Prairie.

In 1943, the Indianapolis Water Company constructed Geist Reservoir in order to prevent a deficit in Indianapolis's water supply. They believed that Fall Creek and the White River would not keep up with the demand for water in Indianapolis. In the 1970s, the company wanted to triple the size of the lake, but the plan was rejected in 1978 and homes began to spring up around the reservoir.

The Fishers population grew slowly to 344 by the 1960 census when rail shipment declined. Per township referendums in 1961, the town provided planning services for Delaware and Fall Creek Townships and approved residential zoning for most of the undeveloped area in the two townships.

The relocation of State Road 37 to the east side of town and the connection with Interstate 69 ensured the future growth of Fishers as a commercial and residential center. The town of Fishers would soon become a fast-growing suburb of Indianapolis. Fall Creek Township became the site of a consolidation of area schools when Hamilton Southeastern High School was formed in the 1960s. In 1989 the town's population reached 7,000 and the first Freedom Festival was held. The festival has been held every year since then.

The Thomas A. Weaver Municipal Complex opened as Fishers' civic and government center in 1992. The complex is home to the Fishers City Hall, the police and fire department headquarters buildings, the Fishers Post Office, the Hamilton County Convention and Visitor's Bureau, and the Fishers Chamber of Commerce. Eventually, a library and an office of the Indiana Bureau of Motor Vehicles were added. This is still the center of government in Fishers.

21st century
The 2000 census reported the population of Fishers at almost 38,000. With the town's affordable homes, growing economy, and proximity to Indianapolis and Interstate 69, the growth in Fishers was tremendous. In 2003 the town of Fishers requested a special census from the U.S. Census Bureau to accurately measure the rapid population growth since 2000. This census would put the town's population at 52,390, a 38 percent increase from the 2000 census. Since then much of the government's resources have been devoted to building parks, maintaining roads, and managing the rapid growth of the town.

In 2005, after a controversy over alleged mismanagement, Conner Prairie formally split from Earlham College, becoming an independent corporation.

In January 2009, the Geist United Opposition conceded a four-year legal battle with Fishers over the involuntary annexation of the contiguous, unincorporated area around Geist Reservoir. This allowed Fishers to annex and incorporate this area of 2,200 homes on January 2, 2010, and to begin taxing it in 2011. This increased Fishers' population by about 5,500, making the town the eighth-largest community in Indiana.

In 2012, Fishers constructed a multipurpose trail in the downtown district and an amphitheater in the Thomas A. Weaver Municipal Complex. That November, the town announced the details of a major development project in the heart of downtown. The $33 million pedestrian-oriented, mixed-use development on the north side of 116th Street, just west of Municipal Drive, broke ground in mid-2013 and was scheduled to be completed in 2015.

City controversy
In 1998, a referendum to change Fishers from a town to a city was rejected by 75% of the town's voters.

In 2008, a group named CityYes began collecting petition signatures for a voter referendum on the question of whether or not to become a city. The town appointed a 44-member citizen study committee to review the benefits and drawbacks of a change of government type.

In December 2010, the Fishers Town Council approved two referendum questions: whether or not to become a traditional city with an elected mayor and traditional city council or a modified city with a mayor elected by and from the expanded nine-member city council. The latter would have also merged the governments of Fishers and Fall Creek Township. In the referendum held November 6, 2012, voters rejected the merger with Fall Creek Township to become a modified city with an appointed mayor 62% to 37%, while approving a change to a traditional "second-class city", with an elected mayor 55% to 44%.

Law and government
Despite its large size, Fishers, unlike nearby Noblesville and Carmel, retained the status of a town for several years. Until 2012, Fishers used a council–manager government with a seven-member town council and a clerk-treasurer, all elected at-large for four years. The town council held both legislative and executive powers while the clerk-treasurer was responsible for financial matters. The council elected a council president (the final president being John Weingardt) and vice president yearly. The council employed and oversaw a town manager responsible for municipal personnel, budget, and day-to-day operations of the town government.

After the changes approved in the November 2012 referendum, the town became a "second-class city", with an elected mayor, city clerk and nine-member city council. on January 1, 2015, following the election of the new officers in the 2014 general election. Scott Fadness, who had been the last town manager, was elected the new city's first mayor.

Demographics

According to a 2007 estimate, the median income for a household in the town was $86,518, and the median income for a family was $103,176. Males had a median income of $58,275 versus $37,841 for females. The per capita income for the town was $31,891. 1.8% of the population and 1.1% of families were below the poverty line. Out of the total population, 1.6% of those under the age of 18 and 0.9% of those 65 and older were living below the poverty line.

The city's homeownership rate was 81.9% with an average of 2.77 people per household. 14.1% of Fishers’ housing units were multi-unit structures. Residents had an average travel time of 23.1 minutes to work each day. Fishers also has one of the lowest unemployment rates in the state at 4.5%.

As of the census of 2010, there were 76,794 people, 27,218 households, and 20,404 families residing in the town. The racial makeup of the town was 85.6% White, 5.6% African American, 0.2% Native American, 5.5% Asian, 1.1% from other races, and 2.1% from two or more races. Hispanic or Latino of any race were 3.4% of the population.

There were 27,218 households, of which 48.1% had children under the age of 18 living with them, 64.1% were married couples living together, 7.9% had a female householder with no husband present, 3.0% had a male householder with no wife present, and 25.0% were non-families. 19.8% of all households were made up of individuals, and 3.8% had someone living alone who was 65 years of age or older. The average household size was 2.82 and the average family size was 3.31.

The median age in the town was 33.2 years. 33% of residents were under the age of 18; 4.9% were between the ages of 18 and 24; 34.4% were from 25 to 44; 22.1% were from 45 to 64; and 5.5% were 65 years of age or older. The gender makeup of the town was 48.6% male and 51.4% female.

Geography

Location
Fishers is located in the southeast corner of Hamilton County at 39°57'22" North, 86°0'46" West (39.956177, −86.012754), along the West Fork of the White River. It is bordered to the west by Carmel, to the north by Noblesville, to the east by the town of Ingalls and unincorporated land in Madison County, to the southeast by Fortville, McCordsville and unincorporated land in Hancock County, and to the south by the city of Indianapolis in Marion County.

Climate
Fishers has a humid continental climate (Köppen climate classification). Summers in Fishers are hot and humid with temperatures regularly in the 85 °F range. Autumns and springs in Fishers have very comfortable temperatures normally around 70 °F, but springs have much less predictable weather and drastic temperature changes are common. Winters are cold and filled with snow and ice storms. During winter, temperatures are normally around 35 °F and often dip below 20 °F at night.

Economy

Top employers
According to the city's 2020 Annual Comprehensive Financial Report, the top employers in the city are:

Transportation
Fishers is located along Interstate 69. The city currently has four exits off the interstate. State Road 37 runs directly through Fishers, connecting Fishers with several other Indiana cities and towns.

Fishers has a general aviation airport, the Indianapolis Metropolitan Airport (KUMP). Indianapolis International Airport is located on the opposite side of Indianapolis from Fishers, about  distant.

Fishers does not have direct service from IndyGo, the regional bus service. Fishers is featured in the first phase of the Indianapolis mass transit plan, featuring a light rail system that will run from downtown Indianapolis through Fishers to Noblesville.

The roads in Fishers are mostly new and well-maintained. 116th Street won the American Concrete Pavement Association Main Street Award in 2006. A number of the town's four-way stops are being replaced by roundabouts.

On April 10, 2012, the town of Fishers announced a $20 million investment in the 2012 "Drive Fishers" initiative; an effort that will focus on areas in Fishers that have had a history of high-traffic volume, such as 96th Street and Allisonville Road, State Road 37, and Fall Creek Road in Geist.

Education

The city is part of the Hamilton Southeastern School District, a district serving almost 21,000 students.

Fishers's quickly growing population has created a need for a similar growth in the number of schools within the Hamilton Southeastern School District as well as additions to existing schools. In 1996 there were four elementary schools, one middle school, one junior high school, and one high school. With the openings of Riverside School and Fishers High School in the 2006–2007 school year and Thorpe Creek Elementary in the 2008–2009 school year, the school district has twelve elementary schools, three intermediate schools, three junior high schools and two high schools.

The two high schools in the district are Hamilton Southeastern High School and Fishers High School. An investment of $10,000,000 was made in Fishers High School and Hamilton Southeastern High School's state-of-the-art College and Career Academy additions, allowing students to experience a more relaxed, college campus-like experience. The glass classroom walls located in the new addition slide open to extend the classroom into the common area.

The thirteen elementary schools are Brooks School Elementary, Cumberland Road Elementary, Durbin Elementary, Fall Creek Elementary, Fishers Elementary, Geist Elementary, Harrison Parkway Elementary, Hoosier Road Elementary, Lantern Road Elementary, New Britton Elementary, Sand Creek Elementary, Thorpe Creek Elementary, and Southeastern Elementary. The newest elementary school, Deer Creek Elementary, is scheduled to open in Fall, 2022, and will replace Durbin Elementary. Each school averages about 1,000 students in attendance.

The four intermediate schools, which students attend through fifth and sixth grade are Fall Creek Intermediate, Riverside Intermediate, Sand Creek Intermediate, and Hamilton Southeastern Intermediate.

The four junior highs, which students attend through seventh and eighth grade, are Fishers Junior High, Hamilton Southeastern Junior High, Riverside Junior High, and Fall Creek Junior High.

Fishers also has several private schools, including Community Montessori School (PK-5), St. Louis de Montfort (PK-8), and Eman Schools (PK-12).  Additional private schools are located in surrounding communities.

Culture

Recreation
One attraction in Fishers is Geist Reservoir, offering activities like fishing and waterskiing. There are many golf courses around Fishers. Fishers was named the second Best Under-rated Golf Community in U.S. by Livability in 2010. Fishers is home to Symphony on the Prairie, a summer concert series that takes place at Conner Prairie, presented by the Indianapolis Symphony Orchestra. The city also offers a free summer concert series behind the Fishers Government Center, in the refurbished Nickel Plate District where an amphitheater was built in 2012. Fishers Music Works, an umbrella organization for smaller music performance ensembles, was created in spring 2013, offering a wide range of free and ticketed concerts, performed by Fishers residents and local talent. The Parks and Recreation Department hosts outdoor movie nights at the amphitheater as well as holiday events. Fishers is located near the Ruoff Home Mortgage Music Center in Noblesville, which hosts concerts.

Fairs

Fishers has two annual festivals: Spark!Fishers and the Fishers Renaissance Faire.

Spark!Fishers takes place every year at the end of June, right before Independence Day. A few annual traditions of the festival are a parade, a 5k run/walk and a fireworks show. There are art and food vendors and game booths. The festival is located at Roy G. Holland Memorial Park. In January 2018, it was announced that the City of Fishers would being Spark!Fishers.
The Fishers Renaissance Faire, presented by the Sister Cities Association of Fishers, has been held annually since 2005. It is held the first week end in October on the grounds of the Saxony development. Its purpose is to celebrate the Sister City relationship of Fishers with Billericay, England. The fair features jousting, pirate shows, magicians, jesters, minstrels, a queen-complete with her royal court, a period village, authentic period/parody staged entertainment, period art and craft vendors, a wide variety of food and beverages, and scripted interactions amongst the cast of 150 authentic, legendary, and historic characters throughout the entire fair. Children's activities are provided by the Fishers Kiwanis and Key Clubs.

Parks and conservation
Fishers is home to over a dozen parks and nature preserves. The Fishers Trail & Greenway System has more than  available for use.

Billericay Park was named after the town's sister town of Billericay in Essex, England. The park has eight youth baseball fields, a multi-use trail through Billericay Woods, a playground, and a splash pad with a picnic facility.
Brooks School Park is a  park that has an ADA accessible playground for children, a multipurpose trail, a large athletic field, and a basketball court.
Cheeney Creek Natural Area includes the Cheeney Creek Greenway and a natural area.
Cumberland Park has soccer fields, a trail along the Mud Creek Greenway, a disc golf course, and a community building.
Cyntheanne Park has five multipurpose athletic fields as well as natural areas, two playground areas, and trails.
Eller Fields are two lighted youth baseball fields and a playground.
Fishers Heritage Park at White River is home to the Historic Ambassador House and Heritage Gardens. More than 170 years ago, a two-story log house was built on what is now the northwest corner of 96th Street and Allisonville Road; this is now known as the Ambassador House. It was carefully cut into two sections and moved to its current location in Heritage Park (106th Street and Eller Road) on November 19, 1996.
Flatfork Creek Park is a new park, slated for opening in fall 2014.
Hamilton Proper Park is a  park.
Harrison Thomas Park is a multi-use park featuring three baseball fields, three soccer fields, a playground, and a 3/4 mile trail.
Hoosier Woods is a small forest.
Mudsock Fields contains three lighted football fields.
Olio Fields is home to several softball fields.
Ritchey Woods Nature Preserve is approximately :  are an Indiana State Designated Nature Preserve, and the remaining  are under a conservation easement governed by the Department of Natural Resources. The preserve offers five trails totaling . Cheeney Creek passes through the north end of the property.
Roy G. Holland Memorial Park is the site of the Fishers Freedom Festival. The park also has soccer, baseball, and softball fields, sand volleyball courts, basketball courts, woods, picnic areas, and a community building.
Wapihani Nature Preserve is a  nature preserve located along the White River in Fishers. It was purchased with White River Restoration Trust funds in early 2006 by the Central Indiana Land Trust. Riverside Middle School is located immediately south of the property. The property is available for students to utilize as an outdoor educational laboratory.

Young people in Fishers have taken leadership roles in teaching elementary students about the environment, in developing a climate change resolution for the city council, and in recycling efforts.

Notable people
Race car driver Michael Andretti and wife Jodi Ann Paterson reside in Fishers.

Famous athletes who currently live in Fishers include Gary Harris of the Orlando Magic; Gordon Hayward of the Charlotte Hornets; Malcolm Brogdon, Chris Duarte and Justin Holiday of the Indiana Pacers and  NFL players Evan Baylis; and Jeremy Chinn of the Carolina Panthers. Famous athletes who have lived in Fishers include former Indiana Pacers players Reggie Miller, Austin Croshere, and Dahntay Jones; Zach Randolph of the Memphis Grizzlies; ;former Atlanta Hawks player Alan Henderson; Taya Reimer of the Michigan State Spartans; Zak Irvin of the Michigan Wolverines; NFL player Rosevelt Colvin, formerly of the Houston Texans, Chicago Bears and New England Patriots; Randy Gregory of the Dallas Cowboys; Joe Reitz of the Indianapolis Colts; former Colts defensive line coach John Teerlinck; former San Diego Padres player Tony Gwynn; former professional wrestler Kevin Fertig, and Cleveland Guardians pitcher Justin Masterson.

Sister city
Fishers is twinned with the town of Billericay, Essex, United Kingdom. Billericay Park is named after the sister city.

References

Sources

External links

 
 City of Fishers official website

 
Cities in Hamilton County, Indiana
Populated places established in 1891
Indianapolis metropolitan area
1891 establishments in Indiana
Cities in Indiana